Bamulia  is a village in Sheopur district of Madhya Pradesh state of India.

References

Villages in Sheopur district